Madhav S Shinde ( 1929 – 28 September 2012), credited as M. S. Shinde,  was a Bollywood film editor who edited over 100 films, notably the cult hit Sholay (1975). Other notables films he worked on include Seeta Aur Geeta, Brahmachari, Shaan and Chamatkar. He received the Filmfare Best Editor award for Sholay in 1975.

Career
Shinde started his career as an editor for Bollywood films in 1960s. Even before editing the classic 1975 release film Sholay, Shinde had worked with director Ramesh Sippy and producer G. P. Sippy on the 1972 film Seeta Aur Geeta starring Hema Malini. Shinde worked for a monthly salary of 2,000 for the Sippys' production house. His work on Sholay of editing 300,000 feet of reel into 18,000 feet is considered remarkable. The earlier submitted version of 21,000 feet long film was further edited after the censors mandated cuts. The film had been reduced to a running time of 3 hours and 20 minutes, and was now without many of its gory scenes, though violence remained both on- and off-screen. Sholay was nominated in nine categories at the 23rd Filmfare Awards but won only the Best Editing Award.

Shinde worked on over 100 Bollywood films. The list of his works includes some successful films like Raaz (1967), Brahmachari (1968), Shaan (1980), Shakti (1982), Razia Sultan (1983), Sohni Mahiwal (1984), Saagar (1985) and Chamatkar (1992). His last film was Zamaana Deewana (1995), starring Shahrukh Khan. Along with films, Shinde was also the editor of the Hindi television classic Buniyaad that aired on DD National in 1986.

Partial filmography 

 1960 Bewaqoof 
 1961 Razia Sultana 
 1961 Mr. India 
 1965 Mere Sanam 
 1966 Dillagi 
 1967 Raaz 
 1968 Brahmachari 
 1969 Ek Shrimaan Ek Shrimati 
 1969 Bandhan 
 1970 Tum Haseen Main Jawan 
 1971 Preetam 
 1972 Seeta Aur Geeta 
 1973 Heera 
 1973 Jheel Ke Us Paar 
 1974 Jurm Aur Sazaa 
 1974 5 Rifles 
 1975 Sholay 
 1976 Bhanwar 
 1977 Chalta Purza 
 1978 Karmayogi 
 1978 Nasbandi 
 1978 Ganga Ki Saugand 
 1978 Trishna 
 1980 Abdullah 
 1980 Alibaba Aur 40 Chor 
 1980 Shaan 
 1981 Jail Yatra 
 1982 Ashanti 
 1982 Dharam Kanta 
 1982 Shakti 
 1983 Bade Dil Wala 
 1984 Sohni Mahiwal 
 1985 Haveli 
 1985 Yaadon Ki Kasam 
 1985 Saagar 
 1986 Love and God 
 1986 Jumbish: A Movement - The Movie 
 1986 Avinash 
 1988 Aakhri Adaalat 
 1988 Kasam
 1989 Mujrim 
 1989 Guru 
 1989 Bhrashtachar 
 1991 Shikari: The Hunter 
 1991 Begunaah 
 1991 Akayla 
 1992 Chamatkar 
 1995 Ram Jaane  
 1995 Zamaana Deewana

Awards
Shinde has won Filmfare Awards in the category of Best Editing for the film Sholay (1975).

Personal life
Shinde was married to Prafula Shinde, who died in 2006 of cancer. They have three daughters. Due to his poor economic conditions he faced problems in getting timely medical help. The cine wing "Maharashtra Navnirman Chitrapat Karmachari Sena" of Maharashtra Navnirman Sena had helped Shinde by providing financial aid.

References

External links

Filmfare Awards winners
Date of birth missing
2012 deaths
Artists from Mumbai
Hindi film editors
Film editors from Maharashtra
Best Editor National Film Award winners